Anna Maria Gardell-Ericson (10 October 1853, Visby – 2 June 1939, Stockholm) was a Swedish painter and watercolorist. She specialized in coastal scenes and landscapes with lakes or rivers.

Biography
Her father, Johan, is generally described as a landscape painter, although he may have been primarily a local administrative officer. 
  
At the age of sixteen, she began painting and displayed sufficient talent for her to be sent to Switzerland to begin her studies. Later, she studied with Per Daniel Holm at the Royal Swedish Academy of Fine Arts in Stockholm; making her début at one of the Academy's exhibitions in 1875. The following year, she won a bronze medal at the Centennial Exposition in Philadelphia.

In 1879, she went to Paris to continue her studies with Alexandre-Louis Leloir and Ferdinand Heilbuth and copied the watercolors of Camille Corot. She had a major showing at the Salon in 1882 and, as a result, received a contract worth 1,000 Francs per month from the art dealers, Goupil & Cie. That same year, she married Johan Ericson (1849-1925), a landscape painter from Karlshamn. She also became a member of the Dudley Gallery art society.

She and her husband lived in France until 1884, when a cholera epidemic broke out in Paris. They then returned to Sweden and settled in Göteborg. While there, she was a regular exhibitor at the Gummeson Gallery and the showings of several art associations. Gardell-Ericson exhibited her work at the Palace of Fine Arts at the 1893 World's Columbian Exposition in Chicago, Illinois.

Shortly before her death, she wrote her memoirs, but these have yet to be published. Major retrospectives were held in 1939 and 1946.

Selected paintings

References

Sources
 Biography from the Svenskt Biografiskt Lexikon @ the Riksarkivet
 Gösta Procopé, Konstnärsparet Anna Gardell-Ericson och Johan Ericson: en minnesbok, Hanseproduktion, 1982

Further reading

External links

 Gardell-Ericson @ the Nationalmuseum
 ArtNet: More works by Gardell-Ericson.

1853 births
1939 deaths
People from Gotland
19th-century Swedish painters
20th-century Swedish painters
19th-century Swedish women artists
20th-century Swedish women artists
Swedish women painters